Chmielecki may refer to:

 Stefan Chmielecki (died 1630), Polish noble
 Teofila Chmielecka (1590–1650), his wife
 Tymon Tytus Chmielecki (born 1965), Polish bishop and Vatican diplomat 
 Witold Chmielecki (born 1966), Polish fantasy writer known by the pseudonym Feliks W. Kres